Slow Dance is a poem by David L. Weatherford which has been widely circulated under an email hoax letter. The e-mail claims that the poem was written by a young cancer patient, and that forwarding the email will raise funds to support the American Cancer Society. Both claims are false.

References

External links
 Poem text

Internet memes